Cyril Edward Dunning (20 February 1888 – 11 January 1962) was an English amateur footballer who played for Norwich City as a midfielder. He also played Minor Counties cricket for Norfolk. He was born at Manor Farm, Colby on 20 February 1888 and died at Paston on 18 January 1962."

Norwich City career 
Dunning played 43 times for Norwich in the Southern League, scoring 25 goals. He also played five times for them in the United League, once without scoring in the Norfolk & Suffolk League and once, again without scoring, in the FA Cup. The FA Cup match was eventful: a first round tie on 1 May 1909 against Reading, which was played at Stamford Bridge, in front of a crowd of 15,732. The match was moved from Norwich's then home ground, The Nest to "a neutral venue when City's opponents complained that the Nest pitch was not big enough"

International career 
In 1909, Dunning played in a South vs North trial match for selection to the England national amateur football team. He was one of four amateur footballers in the squads who played for a professional team. In total, Dunning scored eleven goals in just four matches for England amateurs, all of which in 1909. His tally includes a hat-trick on his debut against Germany to help his team to a 9–0 win, which still is Germany's highest defeat of its history, a poker in a 11–2 win over Belgium and two braces against the Netherlands and Switzerland. Notably, Dunning netted all of these 11 goals within just two months, between March and May 1909. In addition to these goals, he already had scored in February in an unofficial match against Wales to help his side to a 5–2 victory.

Personal life 
Dunning was born on 20 February 1888 in Colby, Norfolk. He attended Bracondale School, and played football there. Between 1905 and 1910, Dunning played Minor Counties cricket for Norfolk. He made 25 appearances, with a best score of 99. He died on 11 January 1962 in Paston, Norfolk.

Career statistics 
England Amateurs score listed first, score column indicates score after each Dunning goal.

References

External links 
 Profil of Cyril Dunning - www.11v11.com

England amateur international footballers
Norwich City F.C. players
English footballers
1888 births
1962 deaths
Norfolk cricketers
People from North Norfolk (district)
Association football midfielders